The 1975 Intercontinental Final was the inaugural Intercontinental Final, introduced for Motorcycle speedway riders as part of the qualification for the 1975 Speedway World Championship.

Four time World Champion Ivan Mauger became the first Intercontinental Final winner, defeating reigning World Champion Anders Michanek by two points at the Ullevi Stadium in Göteborg. Another Swede Bernt Persson defeated Ole Olsen in a runoff for third place. Later in the year Olsen would go on to win his second World title at London's Wembley Stadium.

1975 Intercontinental Final
 3 June
  Göteborg, Ullevi
 Qualification: Top 8 plus 1 reserve to the European Final in Bydgoszcz, Poland.

Classification

References

See also
 Sport in Sweden
 Motorcycle Speedway

1975
World Individual
International sports competitions hosted by Sweden